The men's super-G competition of the Albertville 1992 Olympics was held at Val-d'Isère on Sunday, 16 February.

The defending world champion was Stephan Eberharter of Austria, while Switzerland's Franz Heinzer was the defending World Cup super-G champion, and his countryman Paul Accola was leading the current season.

Norway captured three of the top four spots: Kjetil André Aamodt was the champion, Jan Einar Thorsen was the bronze medalist, and Ole Kristian Furuseth was fourth. Marc Girardelli of Luxembourg took the silver; Tom Stiansen, the fourth and final entrant of Norway, was eighth.
Accola was tenth, Heinzer did not finish, and Eberharter was not selected for the Austrian Olympic team.
 

Aamodt became the first Scandinavian to win an Olympic alpine speed event. The medals were the first for Norway in alpine skiing in forty years, since Stein Eriksen won gold and silver on home country snow in 1952.

Results
The race was started at 11:30 local time, (UTC +1).

References

External links
Results
FIS results

Men's Super G
Winter Olympics